Penstemon alluviorum, known by the common name lowland beardtongue, is a species of flowering plant in the veronica family. It is native to the Eastern United States where it is found in alluvial lowlands, particularly of the Mississippi and Ohio Rivers.

Penstemon alluvoirum is a poorly understood taxon. The differences between this and two related species, Penstemon digitalis and Penstemon laevigatus, are not well resolved. It is identified within the complex by having corollas that are 15–23 mm long, sepals that are 3–6 mm long, and leaves that are 25–40 mm wide. It produces white (rarely lavender) flowers in May.

References

alluviorum
Flora of the Eastern United States